Saif Nabeel (born 4 March 1986) is an Iraqi singer and composer.

Discography
Nabeel began his career as a rapper before shifting his style to Arabic pop music. Working with Nesrat Albader and Alremas.

Singles
2011: "Hay Essanah"
2011: "La Latsadeq"
2012: "Theej Al Sanah"
2013: "Etha Haseet Beya"
2014: "Beddam3ah Ella Shawyah"
2015: "Qabel Youmeen"
2015: "Ma Mertah"
2016: "Ma Yeswoon"
2016: "Ma Be3et Denyay" (featuring Noor AlZeen)
2016: "Yalla Weinah"
2017: "Khayef Men Endy" (featuring Noor AlZeen)
2017: "Ahebbak"
2017: "La Teroh"
2017: "Shakhbarak"
2017: "Bestah Ani"
2017: "Abe Ashoof" (featuring Esraa Alaseel)
2017: "Eddagah Maqsodah"
2017: "Ghalay Enta"
2018: "Ya Denya Henنهه"
2018: "Men Tegheeb"
2018: "Brohak Shareek"
2018: "3esheq Moot"
2018: "Dayekh Beek"
2019: "Qalb Thany"
2019: "Bas Taal"
2019: "Akher Kalam" (featuring Shamma Hamdan)
2019: "Kol Youm Elak Ashtaq"
2020: "Elak"
2020: "Foq Al Qemmah"
2020: "Ma Dareet"
2020: "Loo" (in Arabic: لو)
2021: "Momkin" (featuring Balqees)

See also
List of best-selling music artists

References

Living people
1986 births
Musicians from Baghdad
21st-century Iraqi male singers
Iraqi male singer-songwriters
Iraqi male film actors
Iraqi male television actors